Rudi Action Protrudi (born December 15, 1952) is an American rock musician, songwriter, record producer, artist, and actor best known as the lead vocalist and frontman of the garage band The Fuzztones.

Rudi
Protrudi was born in Washington, D.C.. and raised in Camp Hill, Pennsylvania. Both he and his younger sister, Rene Laigo, inherited their artistic talent from parents, John and Janet.
Rudi attended school in Camp Hill, Lemoyne and New Cumberland, where he graduated from Cedar Cliff High School in 1970. He attended York Academy of Art from 1971 to 1972.
At the age of 12, after seeing The Beatles on The Ed Sullivan Show, Rock & Roll became his obsession.
Through The Beatles, he became familiar with Chuck Berry, who quickly became his idol. Like Berry, Rudi chose guitar as his instrument, and by the age of 14 had formed his first band, King Arthur's Quart.
He continued to play in local bands until 1976 when an audition for the Dead Boys provided him the opportunity to play bass for them at CBGBs. 
Soon afterward, he founded Tina Peel with then girlfriend/live-in partner, Deb O'Nair and they moved to New York in 1977, where their serious music careers started.

Tina Peel 
Bubblegum-Punk band, formed in 1976. Rudi says that this band was heavily influenced by The Monkees, Cryan' Shames, 1910 Fruitgum Company and the Dave Clark 5. It is also Rudi's first band, where he performed as frontman.
Rudi wrote or co-wrote the majority of the original material recorded by Tina Peel with then members Deb O'Nair, Jim Nastix and Jackson Plugs. Dave U. Hall (ex-bassist from Birdland with Lester Bangs) replaced Jim Nastix after his tenure with the band. Dave went under the name Rick O'Shea.
Soon, they became a popular NYC attraction, often headlining the major clubs of the time (Hurrah, Irving Plaza, Ritz, CBGB), as well as appearing on several television shows, including the cult favorite, The Uncle Floyd Show.
Even though the band was courted by major labels, and enjoyed frequent press, Tina Peel broke up when members Rudi Protrudi and Deb O'Nair went on to form The Fuzztones in 1980.

The Fuzztones 

Other band members were Deb O'Nair on keyboards and vocals, Michael Jay on bass, Elan Portnoy on lead guitar and Ira Elliot (now with Nada Surf)(also in Bambi Kino) on drums. Their first studio LP Lysergic Emanations (1985) achieved gold record status.
The band also released a live album with blues legend Screamin' Jay Hawkins in 1984.
One year later the band toured for 3 months in the UK and Europe opening for The Damned, and introducing the 60's garage/ psych sound to a European audience.
After the tour the band broke up, and in 1987 Rudi and new drummer Mike Czekaj moved to Los Angeles, where they reformed the Fuzztones. The additional band members were Jordan Tarlow on guitar, John Carlucci on bass and Jason Savall on organ. This line up toured Europe excessively between 1987 and 1990, and was the only band from the 80's Garage Revival to land a major label record deal (RCA/Beggars Banquet).
Their album, In Heat, was produced by the legendary Shel Talmy. A later line-up has recorded the third studio album called Braindrops (1991), followed by and Monster A Go-Go in 1992.
A live album, Lysergic Ejaculations, was released after their break up in 1992. Rudi wrote or co-wrote the majority of the original material recorded by the Fuzztones.
Among Protrudi's most popular compositions are Ward 81, She's Wicked, Bad News Travels Fast, Highway 69, Nine Months Later, Romilar D, Action Speaks Louder Than Words.
Their version of The Sonics Strychnine reached No. 1 in Italy.
In 2000 Rudi reformed the band with founding member, Deb O'Nair and again toured Europe frequently. In 2003 they released the critically acclaimed studio album "Salt For Zombies". In 2010 they began their new album's tour. The album, named "Preaching to the Perverted", was released in 2011. With Rudi as the only remaining original member, the band is now based out of Berlin and is still touring and releasing albums.

Solo

Personal life 
Rudi's first television appearance was in 1970, when he and his band, Rigor Mortis, played his original composition, "Bandit," on the Weekend Show, Hershey PA.
He made his first record in 1972, a single released by Springhead Motorshark.
In July 2016 he released his autobiographical book called "The Fuzztone".

Discography

Has played with or recorded with 
1. Screamin' Jay Hawkins 
2. Lydia Lunch & The Devil Dogs 
3. Esquerita 
4. The Dead Boys 
5. Peter Stampfel (ex-Fug and Holy Modal Rounder) 
6. Billy Idol 
7. Ian Astbury (The Cult) 
8. Ann Magnuson (Ann's heavy metal satire band, Vulcan Death Grip, appears in her Cinemax special, Vandemonium and performs 2 songs co-written by Rudi.) 
9. Big Sandy 
10. The Unholy Modal Rounders 
11. Sean Bonniwell and Ron Edgar (as Music Machine 2001)
12. Arthur Lee 
13. The Miracle Workers 
14. The Chocolate Watch Band 
15. Craig Moore (GONN)
16. The Surfaris 
17. Vinny Martell (Vanilla Fudge) 
18. Mark Lindsay (former lead singer for Paul Revere & The Raiders)
19. Pretty Things 
20. Sylvain Sylvain (New York Dolls) 
21. Davie Allan 
22. The Damned 
23. Marky Ramone 
24. Jeff Salen (Sparks, Tuff Darts) 
25. Mars Bonfire 
26. Tempest Storm 
27. Dixie Evans 
28. Andy Shernoff & Ross The Boss (The Dictators)
29. The Headhunters
(members of the Fuzztones, Tommyknockers and Groovie Ghoulies) 
30. Steve Mackay (The Stooges) 
31. The 69 Eyes 
32. Sami Yaffa (New York Dolls, Hanoi Rocks) 
33. James Lowe (The Electric Prunes) 
34. Sky Saxon (The Seeds)

References

Further reading
 Interview with Low Cut Magazine
 Article on Leave Your Mind At Home with Screamin' Jay Hawkins
 Screamin' Jay Hawkins Movie
 REM remembers Rudi Protrudi in NYC
 Tina Peel review
 Interview with InYourEyes Zine
 Rudi Protrudi Interview in German Magazine OX 
 Rudi Protrudi Interview in Spanish

External links 
Rudi Protrudi's Official Website
Article on Rudi Protrudi's life in newspaper

Living people
1952 births
People from Washington, D.C.